Taimatí is a corregimiento in Chepigana District, Darién Province, Panama with a population of 764 as of 2010. Its population as of 1990 was 625; its population as of 2000 was 681.

References

Corregimientos of Darién Province